Osagie Ize-Iyamu is a Nigerian pastor, politician, former Chief of Staff and Secretary to the Edo state government. He was the gubernatorial candidate of the Edo state People's Democratic Party for the 2016 Edo state gubernatorial election. He is currently a member of the All Progressives Congress (APC).
He was the National Vice-Chairman, South-South Zone, of the defunct Action Congress of Nigeria (ACN). He is the current APC gubernatorial candidate for the just concluded Edo gubernatorial election in Edo State. He lost to the incumbent governor, Obaseki.

Ize-Iyamu served as Director General of Adams Oshiomhole's 2nd term Campaign Organisation. He was also the Coordinator of Goodluck/Sambo Campaign Organisation in Edo State, 2015. Recently, he was honoured by the Benson Idahosa University

Early life and family
Osagie Ize-Iyamu was born in Benin City to Chief Robert Osayande Ize-Iyamu and Mrs. Magdalene Naghado Ize- Iyamu (née Obasohan). His father was a revered high chief of the Oba of Benin, ranking second in command until his demise as the Esogban of Benin. His mother was a trained teacher who later transitioned into trader.

A most significant aspect of the history of the Ize-Iyamu family is that it holds the record of building and owning the first storey building "Egedege N'Okaro" in the whole of the Mid-Western Region, Nigeria which is the present day Edo and Delta States. It was built in 1906 by Osagie's great grandfather Late Chief Iyamu, the Inneh of Benin Kingdom.

Education
Ize-Iyamu attended St. Joseph Primary School and Ebenezer Nursery and Primary School in Benin City. He had his Secondary education at Edo College and passed out with grade I in his West African Examination Council (WAEC) examinations.
He attended the University of Benin where he graduated with an LL.B (Hons) and proceeded to the Nigerian Law School where he was awarded the Bachelor of Law (BL) qualification and called to the Nigerian Bar in 1987.

He is an honorary doctorate degree holder of the Benson Idahosa University, Benin City. On July 1, 2019, he was recognized for his contribution to the development of Nigeria's democratic process and rule of law when he received the Life Time Achievers Award by the Nigerian Bar Association, Benin (Lion) Branch.

Personal life
Osagie Ize-Iyamu is married to Pastor (Dr) Idia Ize-Iyamu, a Consultant Orthodontist with the University of Benin Teaching Hospital and a Professor in the University of Benin. They have four children.

References

Living people
People from Benin City
Nigerian Christian clergy
Peoples Democratic Party (Nigeria) politicians
Nigerian farmers
Secretaries to the State Government
20th-century Nigerian lawyers
University of Benin (Nigeria) alumni
Year of birth missing (living people)